The 2000 Eastern Illinois Panthers football team represented Eastern Illinois University as a member of the Ohio Valley Conference (OVC) during the 2000 NCAA Division I-AA football season. Led by 14th-year head coach Bob Spoo, the Panthers compiled an overall record of 8–4, finishing second in OVC with a conference mark of 6–1. Eastern Illinois was invited to the NCAA Division I-AA Football Championship playoffs, where they lost in the first round to Montana. The Bobcats were ranked 17th in the final Sports Network poll. Their starting quarterback, Tony Romo, went on to play 14 seasons in the National Football League (NFL).

Schedule

References

Eastern Illinois
Eastern Illinois Panthers football seasons
Eastern Illinois Panthers football